The Mayor of the City of Opa-locka is the official head of the city of Opa-locka in the U.S. state of Florida. 

In the November 2002 election, voters approved extending the term of the mayor from two to four years.

Mayors of Opa-Locka

References

Opa-locka